Evans Creek is a tributary of Peters Creek in San Mateo County, California.

See also
List of rivers of California
List of watercourses in the San Francisco Bay Area

References

Rivers of San Mateo County, California
Rivers of Northern California